Outside is an album by drummer Shelly Manne recorded in 1969, and released on the Contemporary label. The album marks Manne's return to the label after seven years.

Reception

The AllMusic site rated the album 3 stars.

Track listing
 "River Running" (Gary Barone) - 3:45
 "Silent Voices" (Pete Robinson) - 8:58
 "High-Flying Phyllis" (Gene Siegel) - 6:33
 "Steve" (Steve Bohannon) - 7:35
 "For Bean" (Juney Booth) - 5:05
 "Don't Know" (John Morell) - 6:33

Personnel
Shelly Manne - drums
Gary Barone - trumpet, flugelhorn
John Gross - tenor saxophone, flute
Peter Robinson - piano, electric piano
Juney Booth - bass

References

1970 albums
Contemporary Records albums
Shelly Manne albums